Mae Mo is a village and tambon (subdistrict) of Mae Mo District, in Lampang Province, Thailand. In 2005, it had a population of 16,589 people. The tambon contains eight villages.

References

Tambon of Lampang province
Populated places in Lampang province